Lodrawa (aka Lodurva, Lodarva or Laudrava) is a village in Jaisalmer district, Rajasthan, India. It is located 15 kilometers to the north-west of Jaisalmer. Lodrawa was the ancient capital of the Bhati dynasty until Rawal Jaisal founded the Jaisalmer state and moved the capital to Jaisalmer in 1156 CE.

The village and the surrounding area are famous for their historic temples, mostly Jain, originally constructed in the pre-12th-century Maru-Gurjara style of the Chalukya Empire and reconstructed in a similar but more ornate revivalist style in the 17th century.

History
Rawal Deoraj of the Bhati clan established Lodhruva as the capital in the 8th century CE.
The city stood on an ancient trade route through the Thar Desert, which also made it vulnerable to frequent attacks. Mahmud of Ghazni laid siege on the city in 1025 CE. It was again ransacked by Muhammad Ghori in 1178 CE, leading to its abandonment and the establishment of the new fortified capital of Jaisalmer by Rawal Jaisal in 1156 CE. Jaisalmer was situated 16 km away on the Trikuta Hill, where the present fortress stands today.

Lodrawa was also the setting for the doomed love story of Princess Mumal and Mahendra, a prince of Amarkot, recounted in local folklore and songs.

Visitor's attractions

Lodrawa is a popular tourist destination, known for its architectural ruins and surrounding sand dunes. Lodrawa is also famous for the Jain temple dedicated to the 23rd Tirthankara, Parshvanatha. The original temple was destroyed in 1178 AD when Muhammad Ghori attacked the city, but it was reconstructed by Seth Tharu Shah in 1615, with further additions in 1675 and 1687. Restored using state-of-the-art methods in the late 1970s, the temples are reminders of the city's former glory. Other old temples in the area are dedicated to the deities Rishabhanatha, Sambhavanatha, Hinglaj Mata, Chamunda, and Shiva.

Further reading
 Beyond The Dunes: Journeys In Rajasthan, by Juhi Sinha. Penguin Global. .

See also
 History of Jaisalmer
 Bada Bagh

References

External links

 Lodurva at wikimapia
 Legend of Mumal and Mahender in Rajastahni folksong

Villages in Jaisalmer district
History of Rajasthan
Tourist attractions in Jaisalmer district
Former capital cities in India